Allagrapha is a genus of moths of the family Noctuidae.

Species
 Allagrapha aerea (Hübner, [1803])

References
 Allagrapha at Markku Savela's Lepidoptera and Some Other Life Forms
 Natural History Museum Lepidoptera genus database

Plusiinae
Noctuoidea genera